The men's discus throw at the 2013 Asian Athletics Championships was held at the Shree Shiv Chhatrapati Sports Complex on 4 July.

Results

References
Results

Discus
Discus throw at the Asian Athletics Championships